Afrarchaea is a genus of African assassin spiders first described by Raymond Robert Forster & Norman I. Platnick in 1984.

Species
 it contains fourteen species, all found in South Africa:
Afrarchaea ansieae Lotz, 2015 – South Africa
Afrarchaea bergae Lotz, 1996 – South Africa
Afrarchaea cornuta (Lotz, 2003) – South Africa
Afrarchaea entabeniensis Lotz, 2003 – South Africa
Afrarchaea fernkloofensis Lotz, 1996 – South Africa
Afrarchaea godfreyi (Hewitt, 1919) (type) – South Africa
Afrarchaea haddadi Lotz, 2006 – South Africa
Afrarchaea harveyi Lotz, 2003 – South Africa
Afrarchaea kranskopensis Lotz, 1996 – South Africa
Afrarchaea lawrencei Lotz, 1996 – South Africa
Afrarchaea neethlingi Lotz, 2017 – South Africa
Afrarchaea ngomensis Lotz, 1996 – South Africa
Afrarchaea royalensis Lotz, 2006 – South Africa
Afrarchaea woodae Lotz, 2006 – South Africa

References

Endemic fauna of South Africa
Araneomorphae genera
Archaeidae
Spiders of Madagascar
Spiders of South Africa
Taxa named by Raymond Robert Forster